The Tomb of Countess Matilda of Tuscany is a large sculptural memorial designed by the Italian artist Gianlorenzo Bernini and executed by Bernini and various other sculptors. It was commissioned by Pope Urban VIII in 1633 and was destined for St. Peter's, Rome, where it still sits now. The final parts were completed in 1644.

See also
List of works by Gian Lorenzo Bernini

Notes

References

Further reading

External links

1630s sculptures
1640s sculptures
Marble sculptures in Italy
Sculptures by Gian Lorenzo Bernini
Sculptures of angels
Matilda of Tuscany
Sculptures of women in Italy